The Ministry of External Affairs and Defence was a cabinet ministry of the Government of Ceylon that conducted and managed all of Ceylon's relations with other countries and its military matters from 1947 to 1977.

History
The ministry was formally established in 1948 following the independence of Ceylon as the Ministry of External Affairs and Defence, coming under the direct control of the Prime Minister of Ceylon. In 1977, J.R Jayawardena's government adapted two separate ministries, forming the Ministry of Defence and the Ministry of Foreign Affairs.

Senior officials
Prime Minister and Minister of External Affairs and Defence 
Parliamentary Secretary for External Affairs and Defence  
Permanent Secretary of the Ministry of External Affairs and Defence

Departments
 Ceylon Army
 Royal Ceylon Navy
 Royal Ceylon Air Force
 Police Department
 Ceylon Overseas Service
 Department of Information
 Department of Immigration and Emigration

Parliamentary Secretaries
 Hon. Richard Gotabhaya Senanayake (1947-1952)
 Hon. Major Montague "Monti" Jayawickreme (1952-1956)
 Hon. Tikiri Banda Subasinghe (1956-1959) 
 Hon. Felix R. Dias Bandaranaike (1960-1964) 
 Hon. J. R. Jayewardene (1965-1970)
 Hon. Lakshman Jayakody (1970-1972)

Deputy Ministers
 Hon. Lakshman Jayakody (1972-1977)
 Hon. T. B. Werapitiya (1977-1981)

Permanent Secretaries
Incomplete 
 Sir Kanthiah Vaithianathan, CBE (1947–1953)
 Gunasena de Soyza (1953–1960)
 G.V.P. Samarasinghe (1960–1961)
 N.Q. Dias (1961–1965)
 Herbert Tennekoon
 W.T Jayasinghe 
 Dr Arthur Ratnavel

Additional Secretaries
Incomplete 
 S.A. Dissanayake - (former IGP)
 Tissa Wijeyeratne

See also
 Minister of Foreign Affairs (Sri Lanka)
 Minister of Defence (Sri Lanka)
 Minister for Internal Security (Ceylon)
 Diplomatic missions of Sri Lanka

References

External links 
 SOULBURY CONSTITUTION
 Government of Sri Lanka
 Ministry of Foreign Affairs

External Affairs
External Affairs
Ceylon
External Affairs
Sri Lankan diplomats
Sri Lanka, External Affairs
1947 establishments in Ceylon